Sultan Biri Ibn Dunama was the son of Mai Dunama I, and  Fasam from the Kayi ethnic group. Sultan Biri reigned as the king of Kanem, in the early stages of the Kanem Empire

He was once constricted by his mother for executing a thief.

Rulers of the Kanem Empire
12th-century monarchs in Africa